Linda Cook may refer to:

 Linda Cook (actress) (1948–2012), American actress
 Linda Cook (businesswoman) (born 1958), American CEO
 the victim in the murder of Linda Cook